Deanna Marie "Dee" Brasseur,  (born September 9, 1953) is a Canadian retired military officer (Major). She is one of the first three women to earn her wings as a Canadian Forces (C.F.) military pilot for active duty and also one of the first of two female CF-18 Hornet fighter pilots in the world.

Born in Pembroke, Ontario, a daughter to Lieutenant Colonel (Retired) Lionel C. (Lyn) Brasseur and Marie Olive (Aucoin), she joined the Canadian Forces in 1972 as an administrative clerk at a dental unit detachment in Winnipeg, Manitoba. The following year, she was accepted for commissioning under the Officer Candidate training program. She graduated as an Air Weapons Controller in 1974. In 1979, she was accepted for pilot training. She along with Nora Bottomley and Leah Mosher graduated from Canadian Forces Flight Training School in Portage la Prairie. She received her wings in 1981. In 1988, she took fighter pilot training. In June 1989, following twelve months of training on Canadair CF-5 and McDonnell Douglas CF-18 Hornet jet fighter aircraft, Brasseur and Captain Jane Foster (pilot) became the only two women in the world flying fighters in operational squadrons. Canada was the first country to allow women to fly in a combat role since the Second World War, when the Soviet Union used women pilots. Brasseur was promoted to major in 1989 and posted to National Defence Headquarters (Canada) in Ottawa at the Directorate of Flight Safety, in March 1990. She retired from the military in 1994 with 2,500 hours of jet flying.

In 1998, a Maclean's cover story on sexual abuse in the Canadian Forces prompted Brasseur to go public with her own experiences. In the June 1 edition of the magazine, Brasseur claimed that throughout her 21-year career she faced unwanted sexual advances, was raped by her enlisted boyfriend and was coerced into having sex with her flight teacher.

In 1998, she was made a Member of the Order of Canada. In 2007, she was inducted into the Women in Aviation International Pioneer Hall of Fame.

References

External links 
 

1953 births
Living people
Canadian aviators
Royal Canadian Air Force officers
Members of the Order of Canada
People from Pembroke, Ontario
Canadian female military personnel
Canadian women aviators